Finn Geipel (born 23 November 1958 in Stuttgart) is a German Architect and Urbanist. He is co-founder of the architecture and urban planning office LIN.

Life 
Geipel studied architecture from 1981 to 1987 at the University of Stuttgart. In 1983, together with Bernd Hoge and Jochen Hunger, he founded Labfac, Laboratory for Architecture, a network of architects and artists. In 1987, collaboration with Nicolas Michelin began a new chapter of Labfac in Paris.

In 2001, Finn Geipel and Giulia Andi founded the architecture and urban planning office LIN. Based in Berlin and Paris, the office works on a wide range of projects and research assignments throughout Europe. Recent projects include the renovation of Saint-Nazaire submarine bunker, the Cité du Design in St. Etienne and Grand Paris Métropole Douce.

Finn Geipel is a full-time professor of architecture and building science in the architecture department at Berlin Institute of Technology, since 2000. He is the advisor of the Laboratory for Integrative Architecture (LIA), a research branch of LIN at Berlin Institute of Technology. He has been a visiting professor at École Spéciale d'Architecture (ESA) Paris, Escola Tècnica Superior d'Arquitectura (ESARQ) Barcelona, Columbia University New York and Massachusetts Institute of Technology (MIT) Boston-Cambridge.

Since 2012, Finn Geipel has been a member of the Cluster of Excellence at Humboldt University of Berlin.

Finn Geipel is a member of the AIGP-Atelier International du Grand Paris, the scientific advisory board of the Grand Paris Métropole Douce.

Work 
 Flexible Roof of Arena, Nîmes, France (1989)
 École Nationale d’Arts Décoratifs, Limoges, France (1990–1994)
 Théâtre de Cornouaille, Quimper, France (1991–1998)
 Exhibitionspace Pavillon de l’Arsenal, Paris, France (2003)
 Alvéole 14, Transformation Submarine Bunker, St. Nazaire, France (2003–2007)
 Syn chron, Installation Carsten Nicolai, Neue Nationalgalerie, Berlin, Germany (2005)
 Cité du Design, St. Etienne, France (2004–2009)
 Grand Paris Métropole Douce, Paris, France (2008–2009)
 Atelier Building Pajol, Paris, France (2008–2012)
Bagneux–Lucie Aubrac Paris Métro station, Paris, France, 2022

Awards 
 2010: Chevalier de la Légion d‘Honneur
 2006: Chevalier des Arts et des Lettres

Publications 
 Jac Fol: Labfac: Finn Geipel, Nicolas Michelin Laboratory for Architecture Centre Georges Pompidou, 1998 Paris,  
 Wilhelm Klauser, Catherine Métais-Bürend, Isabelle Taudière: LABFAC In: L’Architecture d’Aujourd’hui n°327 April 2000, Paris
 Finn Geipel, Giulia Andi: Cité du Design – Saint-Étienne Editions Jean-Michel Place, 2006 Paris,  
 Finn Geipel, Giulia Andi, équipe LIN: Grand Paris métropole douce : Hypothèses sur le paysage post-Kyoto Ed. Nouvelles éditions Jean-Michel Place, 2009 Paris,

Links 
 Official Website of LIN

References 

21st-century German architects
1958 births
Living people
Architects from Stuttgart
Academic staff of the Technical University of Berlin